Fatumasin is a mountain in the district of Liquiçá in East Timor, a country occupying the eastern end of the island of Timor in the Lesser Sunda Islands of Wallacea. The surrounding forest is called Hutan Gunung Maelulu in Indonesian. It is a 13,618 ha mountain forest (or forested mountain) and forms one of the country's Important Bird Areas.

Description 
The mountain stands about 26 km south-west of the national capital of Dili. The forest ranges in elevation from about 800 m upwards to the 1369 m summit. The underlying rocks are non-calcareous and the forest is considered to be more species-rich than most others on the island.

Birds 
The site has been identified by BirdLife International as an Important Bird Area (IBA) because it supports populations of bar-necked cuckoo-doves, pink-headed imperial pigeons, yellow-crested cockatoos, jonquil parrots, streak-breasted honeyeaters, Timor friarbirds, black-breasted myzomelas, plain gerygones, fawn-breasted whistlers, green figbirds, olive-brown orioles, Timor stubtails, Timor leaf warblers, orange-sided thrushes, Timor blue flycatchers, blue-cheeked flowerpeckers and flame-breasted sunbirds.

See also
 List of Important Bird Areas in East Timor

References 

Mountains of East Timor
Important Bird Areas of East Timor
Liquiçá Municipality